Susanne Ward (born 19 April 1974) is a Danish sailor. She competed at the 1992, 1996, 2000, and the 2004 Summer Olympics.

References

External links
 
 

1974 births
Living people
Danish female sailors (sport)
Olympic sailors of Denmark
Sailors at the 1992 Summer Olympics – 470
Sailors at the 1996 Summer Olympics – 470
Sailors at the 2000 Summer Olympics – 470
Sailors at the 2004 Summer Olympics – 470
People from Hørsholm Municipality
Sportspeople from the Capital Region of Denmark